Acetobacter fabarum is a bacterium that was first identified from fermenting cocoa beans in Ghana.

Description
A. fabarum are gram-negative bacteria that appear as rounded rods, approximately 0.8 micrometers by 1.2 to 3 micrometers in size. If grown on agar plates, A. fabarum forms beige, round colonies that grow to 0.8 millimeters after three days at 28°C.

See also
 Food Microbiology
 List of microorganisms used in food and beverage preparation

References

External links
 http://aem.asm.org/content/80/6/1848.full
 https://www.uniprot.org/taxonomy/483199
 
Type strain of Acetobacter fabarum at BacDive -  the Bacterial Diversity Metadatabase

Rhodospirillales
Bacteria described in 2008